Five referendums were held in Switzerland during 2005. The first two were held on 5 June on Switzerland joining the Schengen Area and whether registered partnerships for same-sex couples should be introduced. Both questions were approved. The third was held on 25 September on a federal resolution on extending the agreement on free movement of people to new members of the European Union, and was also approved. The final two were held on 27 November on a popular initiative "for food from an agriculture free of genetic modification" and on a labour law related to the opening times of shops in public transport hubs. Both were approved.

June referendums

Schengen

Background
In a 1992 referendum Swiss voters rejected membership of the European Economic Area, which had been seen as a stepping stone on the way to membership of the European Union (EU). Polls consistently showed that the Swiss did not want to join the European Union, which was confirmed in a 2001 referendum where over 75% voted against membership. The traditional Swiss policy of avoiding foreign entanglements was also shown by it not joining the United Nations until 2002. Business and political leaders in Switzerland however were concerned over Switzerland being isolated so the Swiss government pursued a policy of bilateral agreements with the European Union. The EU required Switzerland to join the Schengen Agreement in order that other areas of the relationship, such as trade agreements, could continue.

In the referendum the Swiss were asked to decide whether Switzerland should become part of the Schengen and Dublin agreements. If the Schengen agreement was accepted then Switzerland would have to open their borders and end any systematic checks on identity at the borders by 2007. Switzerland would become part of a passport free zone, however customs controls would remain as Switzerland was not a member of the European Union. The agreements would also mean that Switzerland and the European Union would share information on crime and asylum applications. The Dublin agreement would let Switzerland turn away any asylum applicants who had already claimed asylum in another signatory of the agreements. The Swiss government estimated that this would reduce applications by about 20%.

Campaign
The Swiss government and parliament approved the accession of Switzerland to the agreements in 2003 but the Swiss People's Party collected 86,000 signatures in order to force a referendum on the agreements. The government sold the agreements as a security arrangement which had nothing to do with membership of the European Union. They said that Switzerland was completely surrounded by the European Union and could not solve problems on their own.

Opponents, including the Campaign for an Independent and Neutral Switzerland and the Swiss People's Party, linked the agreements to fears over immigration. They also said that by agreeing to these agreements the government was taking Switzerland closer to European Union membership and that the agreements would give more power to bureaucrats in Brussels.

Opinion polls before the referendum showed about 55% in favour and 35% against, with the rest undecided. As the referendum neared, the polls showed that support was falling, with the rejection of the European constitution in referendums in France and the Netherlands encouraging opponents of the agreements.

Results

The results showed about 1.47 million voted in favour of the Schenegen agreement which was about 55% of those who voted. Turnout, at 55.9% of voters, was about 10% higher than usual in Swiss referendums. Those Swiss who lived abroad were strongly in favour of joining the Schengen area, while within Switzerland German speakers in eastern Switzerland were mainly against and French speakers in western Switzerland were mainly in favour.

Results by canton

Reactions
The government of Switzerland welcomed the results and promised not to ignore opponents of the agreements. The European Commission also welcomed the result of the referendum and described it as an "important step" in Swiss-EU relations. Opponents called on the government to withdraw their application for membership of the European Union. Meanwhile, an upcoming referendum in September on extending the free movement of labour to the 10 newest members of the European Union was seen as likely to be a harder test.

Registered partnerships
Switzerland was the last republic in Europe to give women the right to vote but in this referendum the Swiss became the first in Europe to hold a referendum on increased rights for same-sex couples. Approval in the referendum would mean that same-sex couples would be able to register their partnerships at civil register offices. These registered partnerships would be legally binding agreements which could only be dissolved in the courts. Same-sex couples would get the same inheritance, pension, social security and tax rights and obligations as heterosexual couples. However they would not get the right to adopt or get fertility treatment.

A leader of the campaign for the approval of registered partnerships estimated that about 5 to 10% of the population were homosexual however the government did not expect a large number of people to register their partnerships. Registered partnerships had already been introduced in the cantons of Fribourg, Geneva, Neuchâtel and Zurich. Parliament approved the introduction of the registered partnerships but conservatives gathered the necessary number of signatures to force a referendum.

The government's opinion was that Switzerland needed registered partnerships as the current situation gave "insufficient legal protection" for such same-sex relationships. Opponents including the Swiss People's Party, Evangelical People's Party and some church groups opposed the introduction of the partnerships as they wanted to keep marriage and the family as a special status. A poll in April showed 66% in favour and 24% against, while another in May had 67% in favour and 24% against.

Results
The result of the referendum had most cantons in favour of the introduction of the registered partnerships with opposition concentrated mainly in the Roman Catholic central and southern areas of Switzerland.

September referendum

November referendums

References

2005 elections in Switzerland
2005 referendums
Referendums in Switzerland
LGBT rights in Switzerland
2005 in international relations
Switzerland–European Union relations